Sanad is a village located in the Čoka municipality, in the North Banat District of Serbia. It is situated in the Autonomous Province of Vojvodina. The village has a Serb ethnic majority and its population numbering 1,314 people (2002 census). Sanad is mostly agricultural village and it is located at the left bank of the river Tisza.

Name
In Serbian the village is known as Sanad (Санад), in Hungarian as Szanád, in German as Sanad, in Romanian as Sanad, and in Croatian as Sanad.

Historical population

1961: 1,892
1971: 1,770
1981: 1,584
1991: 1,384
2002: 1,314

See also
List of places in Serbia
List of cities, towns and villages in Vojvodina

References
Slobodan Ćurčić, Broj stanovnika Vojvodine, Novi Sad, 1996.

Gallery

Populated places in Serbian Banat
Čoka